Andrea Borsa (born January 21, 1972) is an Italian former footballer who played as a defender. He made more than 200 appearances in the Italian professional leagues, including an appearance in Serie A for Roma in the 1994–95 season.

References

1972 births
Living people
Italian footballers
Association football defenders
Carrarese Calcio players
U.S. Pistoiese 1921 players
A.S. Roma players
S.P.A.L. players
A.S. Sambenedettese players
Imolese Calcio 1919 players
Serie A players
Serie B players